The Université libre de Bruxelles (abbreviated ULB) is a French-speaking research university in Brussels, Belgium. ULB is one of the two institutions tracing their origins to the Free University of Brussels, founded in 1834 by the lawyer and liberal politician Pierre-Théodore Verhaegen.

The split occurred along linguistic lines, forming the French-speaking ULB in 1969, and Dutch-speaking Vrije Universiteit Brussel (VUB) in 1970. A major research center open to Europe and the world, the ULB now has about 24,200 students, 33% of whom come from abroad, and an equally cosmopolitan staff.

Name
Brussels has two universities whose names mean Free University of Brussels in English: the French-speaking Université libre de Bruxelles (ULB) and the Dutch-speaking Vrije Universiteit Brussel (VUB). Neither uses the English translation, since it is ambiguous.

History

Establishment of a university in Brussels

The history of the Université libre de Bruxelles is closely linked with that of Belgium itself. When the Belgian State was formed in 1830 by nine breakaway provinces from the Kingdom of the Netherlands, three state universities existed in the cities of Ghent, Leuven and Liège, but none in the new capital, Brussels. Since the government was reluctant to fund another state university, a group of leading intellectuals in the fields of arts, science, and education — amongst whom the study prefect of the Royal Athenaeum of Brussels, Auguste Baron, as well as the astronomer and mathematician Adolphe Quetelet — planned to create a private university, which was permitted under the Belgian Constitution.

In 1834, the Belgian episcopate decided to establish a Catholic university in Mechelen with the aim of regaining the influence of the Catholic Church on the academic scene in Belgium, and the government had the intent to close the university at Leuven and donate the buildings to the Catholic institution. The country's liberals strongly opposed to this decision, and furthered their ideas for a university in Brussels as a counterbalance to the Catholic institution. At the same time, Auguste Baron had just become a member of the freemasonic lodge Les Amis Philantropes. Baron was able to convince Pierre-Théodore Verhaegen, the president of the lodge, to support the idea for a new university. On 24 June 1834, Verhaegen presented his plan to establish a free university.

After sufficient funding was collected among advocates, the Université libre de Belgique ("Free University of Belgium") was inaugurated on 20 November 1834, in the Gothic Room of Brussels Town Hall. The date of its establishment is still commemorated annually, by students of its successor institutions, as a holiday called Saint-Verhaegen/Sint-Verhaegen (often shortened to St V) for Pierre-Théodore Verhaegen. In 1836, the university was renamed the Université libre de Bruxelles ("Free University of Brussels").

After its establishment, the Free University faced difficult times, since it did receive no subsidies or grants from the government; yearly fundraising events and tuition fees provided the only financial means. Verhaegen, who became a professor and later head of the new university, gave it a mission statement which he summarised in a speech to King Leopold I: "the principle of free inquiry and academic freedom uninfluenced by any political or religious authority." In 1858, the Catholic Church established the Saint-Louis Institute in the city, which subsequently expanded into a university in its own right.

Growth, internal tensions and move

The Free University grew significantly over the following decades. In 1842, it moved to the Granvelle Palace, which it occupied until 1928. It expanded the number of subjects taught and, in 1880, became one of the first institutions in Belgium to allow female students to study in some faculties. In 1893, it received large grants from Ernest and Alfred Solvay and Raoul Warocqué to open new faculties in the city. A disagreement over an invite to the anarchist geographer Élisée Reclus to speak at the university in 1893 led to some of the liberal and socialist faculty splitting away from the Free University to form the New University of Brussels (Université nouvelle de Bruxelles) in 1894. The institution failed to displace the Free University, however, and closed definitively in 1919.

In 1900, the Free University's football team won the bronze medal at the Summer Olympics. After Racing Club de Bruxelles declined to participate, a student selection with players from the university was sent by the Federation. The team was enforced with a few non-students. The Institute of Sociology was founded in 1902, then in 1904 the Solvay School of Commerce, which would later become the Solvay Brussels School of Economics and Management. In 1911, the university obtained its legal personality under the name Université libre de Bruxelles - Vrije Hogeschool te Brussel.

The German occupation during World War I led to the suspension of classes for four years in 1914–1918. In the aftermath of the war, the Free University moved its principle activities to the Solbosch in the southern suburb of Ixelles and a purpose-built university campus was created, funded by the Belgian American Educational Foundation. The university was again closed by the German occupiers during World War II on 25 November 1941. Students from the university were involved in the Belgian Resistance, establishing Groupe G which focused on sabotage.

Splitting of the university
Until the early 20th century, courses at the Free University were taught exclusively in French, the language of the upper class in Belgium at that time, as well as of law and academia. However, with the Dutch-speaking population asking for more rights in Belgium (see Flemish Movement), some courses began being taught in both French and Dutch at the Faculty of Law as early as 1935. Nevertheless, it was not until 1963 that all faculties offered their courses in both languages. Tensions between French- and Dutch-speaking students in the country came to a head in 1968 when the Catholic University of Leuven split along linguistic lines, becoming the first of several national institutions to do so.

On 1 October 1969, the French and Dutch entities of the Free University separated into two distinct sister universities. This splitting became official with the act of 28 May 1970, of the Belgian Parliament, by which the French-speaking Université libre de Bruxelles (ULB) and the Dutch-speaking Vrije Universiteit Brussel (VUB) officially became two separate legal, administrative and scientific entities.

Campuses
The ULB comprises three main campuses: the Solbosch campus, on the territories of the City of Brussels and Ixelles municipalities in the Brussels-Capital Region, the Plaine campus in Ixelles, and the Erasmus campus in Anderlecht, beside the Erasmus Hospital.

The main and largest campus of the university is the Solbosch, which hosts the administration and general services of the university. It also includes most of the faculties of the humanities, the École polytechnique, the large library of social sciences, and among the museums of the ULB, the Museum of Zoology and Anthropology, the Allende exhibition room and the Michel de Ghelderode Museum-Library.

The Plaine campus hosts the Faculty of Science and the Faculty of Pharmacy. There are also the Experimentariums of physics and chemistry, the Museum of Medicinal Plants and Pharmacy and student housing. This site is served by Delta station.

The Erasmus campus houses the Erasmus Hospital and the Pôle Santé, the Faculty of Medicine, the School of Public Health and the Faculty of Motor Sciences. There is also the School of Nursing (with the Haute école libre de Bruxelles – Ilya Prigogine), the Museum of Medicine and the Museum of Human Anatomy and Embryology. This site is served by Erasme/Erasmus metro station.

The university also has buildings and activities in the Brussels municipality of Auderghem, and outside of Brussels, in Charleroi on the Aéropole Science Park and Nivelles.

Faculties and institutes

 Institute for European Studies
 Interfacultary School of Bio-Engineering
 School of Public Health
 High Institute of Physical Education and Kinesiotherapy
 Institute of Work Sciences
 Institute of Statistics and Operational Research
 Institute for Astronomy and Astrophysics
 Solvay Brussels School of Economics and Management
 Faculty of Sciences

International Partnerships
University of California, Berkeley, University of Oxford, University of Cambridge, Université de Montréal, Waseda University, Université Pierre et Marie Curie - Paris VI, BeiHang University, Universidade de São Paulo, Université de Lausanne, Université de Genève, University Ouaga I Pr. Joseph Ki-Zerbo, University of Lubumbashi

Research
At the heart of the Free University of Brussels there are at least 2000 PhD students and around 3600 researchers and lecturers who work around different scientific fields and produce cutting-edge research.

The projects of these scientists span thematics that concern exact, applied and human sciences and researchers at the heart of the ULB have been awarded numerous international awards and recognitions.

The research carried out at the ULB is financed by different bodies such as the European Research Council, the Walloon Region, the Brussels Capital Region, the National Fund for Scientific Research, or one of the foundations that are dedicated to research at the ULB; the ULB Foundation or the Erasme Funds. 

Since the early 2000s, the MAPP project has started studying political party membership evolution through the time.

Rankings

Notable people

Count Richard Goblet d'Alviella, Belgian businessman
Jules Anspach (1829–1879), law, politician, Mayor of Brussels.
Philippe Autier, epidemiologist and clinical oncologist
Zénon-M. Bacq, radiobiologist, laureate of the 1948 Francqui Prize
Radu Bălescu, Romanian and Belgian physicist, laureate of the 1970 Francqui Prize
Saeed Bashirtash, Iranian dentist, writer and political activist
Didier Bellens, economics, CEO of Belgacom
Vincent Biruta, serving as Minister of foreign affairs, Rwanda
Jules Bordet, physician, laureate of the 1919 Nobel Prize in Physiology or Medicine
Karel Bossart, aeronautical engineer, designer of the SM-65 Atlas
Jean Brachet (1909–1998), medicine, biochemist
Robert Brout, Belgian physicist, laureate of the 2004 Wolf Prize
Jean Bourgain, Belgian mathematician, laureate of the 1994 Fields Medal
Heidi Cruz, wife of US presidential candidate Ted Cruz
Herman De Croo, law, politician
Vũ Đức Đam (b. 1963), politician, current Deputy Prime Minister of Vietnam.
Pierre Deligne, Belgian mathematician, laureate of the 1978 Fields Medal
Antoine Depage, Belgian surgeon
Mathias Dewatripont, Belgian economist, laureate of the 1998 Francqui Prize
François Englert, Belgian physicist, laureate of the 2004 Wolf Prize, laureate of the 2013 Nobel Prize in Physics
Jacques Errera, Belgian physicochemist, laureate of the 1938 Francqui Prize
Aleth Félix-Tchicaya, Congolese writer
Louis Franck, Belgian lawyer, liberal politician and statesman
Matyla Ghyka, Romanian poet, novelist, mathematician, historian, and diplomat
Michel Goldman, Belgian immunologist
Nico Gunzburg (1882–1984), lawyer and criminologist.
Camille Gutt (1884–1971), law, first Managing Director of the International Monetary Fund
Marc Henneaux, Belgian physicist, laureate of the 2000 Francqui Prize
Amir Abbas Hoveida, Iranian Prime Minister
Enver Hoxha, Albanian politician, leader of Communist Albania
Julius Hoste Jr., Belgian businessman and leading Flemish liberal politician
Léon Van Hove (1924–1990), physics, laureate of the 1958 Francqui Prize, Director General of the CERN (1976–1980)
Paul Janson (1840–1913), liberal politician.
Bahadir Kaleagasi, European law & economics, International co-ordinator of TUSIAD
Jeton Kelmendi, Albanian writer, laureate of the 2010 International Solenzara Prize
Henri La Fontaine, Belgian lawyer, laureate of the 1913 Nobel Prize for Peace
Roberto Lavagna (b. 1942), former Argentine minister of economy (2002–2005)
Maurice Lippens, Belgian businessman
Lucien Lison, Belgian and Brazilian physician and biochemist, the father of histochemistry.
Amer Husni Lutfi (b. 1956), economics, politician, Syrian minister of economy and trade
Paul Magnette, Belgian political scientist, laureate of the 2000 Exceptional Francqui Prize for European Research
Marguerite Massart first Belgian female engineer
Adolphe Max (1869–1939), law, politician, Mayor of Brussels from 1909 until his death.
Adrien-Jean Le Mayeur, Belgian painter residing in Bali, Indonesia
Fradique de Menezes (b. 1942), President of São Tomé and Príncipe since 2001
Françoise Meunier, medicine, Director General of the EORTC.
Constantin Mille, Romanian socialist militant and journalist
Axel Miller, Belgian businessman, CEO of Dexia
Roland Mortier, Belgian philologist, laureate of the 1965 Francqui Prize
François Narmon, economist, businessman
Amélie Nothomb (b. 1967), Belgian writer, laureate of the 1999 Grand Prix du roman de l'Académie française
Paul Otlet (1868–1944), law, founding father of documentation
Henri De Page (1894–1969), law, professor in law, generally seen as the most important Belgian lawyer ever.
Marc Parmentier, medicine, laureate of the 1999 Francqui Prize
Etienne Pays (b. 1948), molecular biologist, laureate of the 1996 Francqui Prize and Carlos J. Finlay Prize for Microbiology
Robert Peston, ITV News Political Editor
Martine Piccart, medicine, President of the EORTC.
Marie Popelin (1846–1913), law, feminist
Ilya Prigogine, Belgian physicist and chemist, laureate of the 1955 Francqui Prize, and laureate of the 1977 Nobel Prize in Chemistry
Lodewijk De Raet, Belgian economist and politician
Eric Remacle, Belgian economist, laureate of the 2000 Exceptional Francqui Prize for European Research
Jan Van Rijswijck (1853–1906), law, mayor of Antwerp
David Ruelle, Belgian and French mathematical physicist
Pedro Sánchez (b.1972), Prime Minister of Spain since June 2018
Jean Auguste Ulric Scheler, Belgian philologist
Paul-Henri Spaak, Belgian politician and one of the Founding fathers of the European Union
Isabelle Stengers, chemistry, philosophy
Jean Stengers (1922–2002), historian
Jacques Tits, Belgian mathematician, laureate of the 1993 Wolf Prize and of the 2008 Abel Prize
Michel Vanden Abeele, economics, diplomat
Raoul Vaneigem, Situationist theorist
Emile Vandervelde (1866–1938) Belgian statesman and socialist leader, lawyer and sociologist
Adamantios Vassilakis (b. 1942), former Greek ambassador to the United Nations
August Vermeylen, Belgian writer and literature critic

Éliane Vogel-Polsky (1926 – 2015) was a Belgian lawyer and feminist
Raoul Warocqué, Belgian industrialist
Charles Woeste (1837–1922), lawyer and politician
Odette De Wynter, first women to be a notary in Belgium.

Nobel Prize Winners
For pre-1970 notable faculty and alumni, see Free University of Brussels.
Ilya Prigogine (1917–2003): Nobel Prize in Chemistry in 1977.
François Englert (born 1932): Nobel Prize in Physics in 2013.
Denis Mukwege (born 1955): Nobel Prize for Peace in 2018.

See also

 List of split up universities
 Science and technology in Brussels
 Top Industrial Managers for Europe
 Atomium Culture
 Institut Jules Bordet
 Royal Statistical Society of Belgium
 University Foundation

Notes

References
 Despy, A., 150 ans de L‘ULB. Université libre de Bruxelles, Brussels, 1984
 Noel, F., 1894. Université libre de Bruxelles en crise, Brussels, 1994
 The ULB, a university born of an idea
 ULB, at a glance

External links

 
Engineering universities and colleges in Belgium
Educational institutions established in 1969
1969 establishments in Belgium